The following is a list of events affecting Philippine television in 1983. Events listed include television show debuts, finales, cancellations, and channel launches, closures and rebrandings, as well as information about controversies and carriage disputes.

Premieres

Unknown
 Ang Dating Daan on IBC 13
 Gulong ng Palad on City 2 Television
 It's a Real Deal on MBS 4
 Ito-Iyon: Ang Galing! on MBS 4
 Mga Alagad ni Kalantiao on GMA
 The A-Team on GMA
 The Bob Stewart Show on GMA
 Pasikatan sa Siete on GMA
 Philippines for Jesus Presents on GMA
 Stop, Look, & Listen on GMA
 Island Life on RPN
 Life on Earth on RPN
 Olympic Library on RPN
 Paglipas ng Panahon on RPN
 Ringside at Elorde on IBC 13
 This is It! on IBC 13
 Island Life on RPN
 Tell The People on RPN 9
 Sesame! on RPN 9

Finales

Unknown
 The Other Side of Alma on MBS 4
 Cheers on MBS 4
 Chat Silayan Drama Studio on GMA
 M*A*S*H on GMA
 Flordeluna: Book 1 on RPN
 Gulong ng Buhay on RPN
 Helpline sa 9 on RPN
 Tambakan Alley, Etc. on RPN

Births
January 3 – Precious Lara Quigaman, actress, endorser, and beauty queen
February 28 – Assunta De Rossi, actress and model
March 11 – Bianca Gonzalez, TV host and model
June 24 – John Lloyd Cruz, actor, model, and TV host
July 27 – AJ Dee, Filipino actor
August 10 - Mark Bautista, singer and actor
September 9 – Kristine Hermosa, actress
September 17 – Ice Seguerra, actor and songwriter
October 25 - Elizalde Kid Camaya, Broadcaster and TV Personality (former actor and singer)

See also
1983 in television

References

 
Television in the Philippines by year
Philippine television-related lists